The 155th Air Refueling Wing (155 ARW) is a unit of the Nebraska Air National Guard, stationed at Lincoln Air National Guard Base, Nebraska. If activated to federal service, the Wing is gained by the United States Air Force Air Mobility Command.

Mission
The 155th operates the KC-135R Stratotanker, which is responsible for conducting air refueling missions around the world. The unit runs like an active duty base on a smaller scale.

Full-time Air Force Security Forces personnel patrol the base and provide security for the aircraft 24 hours a day while firefighter personnel are always on station and on call. The other units on the base usually operate during the day and are also staffed by Active Guard Reserve (AGR) or civilian Technician personnel.

History
Established on 1 July 1960, by the Nebraska Air National Guard as an expansion of the 173d Fighter-Interceptor Squadron, increased staffing was authorized by the National Guard Bureau to about 900 people.  the 173d FIS had won the coveted Spaatz Trophy, as the Guard's finest flying unit in 1963, following second and third-place finishes in 1961 and 1962 respectively. In 1962, 1963 and 1964 the unit won its second, third and fourth Winston P. Wilson Trophies.

In May 1964 the mission of the Nebraska Air Guard changed from air defense to tactical reconnaissance using the RF-84 Thunderflash aircraft. The 173rd became the 173rd Tactical Reconnaissance Squadron and the 155th Fighter Group became the 155th Tactical Reconnaissance Group.

The first RF-4C Phantom II came to Lincoln in November 1971. In 1972 the unit began its conversion to the RF-4C from the RF-84F.

In April 1992 the unit was directed to convert to the KC-135R Stratotanker mission when the U.S. Air Force decided to begin retiring the last of the F-4 Phantom II aircraft. The conversion to the aerial refueling mission began in September 1993 with the arrival of the first KC-135R tanker. On 1 Oct. 1995, the unit was re-designated as the 155th Air Refueling Wing after achieving initial operational capability in the refueling mission three months early.

In April 1999, the unit flew its first combat missions. It was the first Air Guard tanker unit to be tasked with supporting Operation Allied Force, the NATO bombing campaign of Serbia and Kosovo.  The unit successfully deployed two aircraft and more than 80 personnel to Germany in less than three days and soon became the lead unit for all American tanker operations from its German air base.

Assistance
Along with its federal mission, the Nebraska unit is tasked with supporting the state government as well. Since its organization in 1946, it has answered the governor's call on numerous occasions including Operation Snowbound in early 1949 and a special call in May 1975 when 435 Air Guard members were activated to assist in securing a tornado ravaged area in Omaha. In November 1997, Air Guard members were once again called to state active duty to assist in helping Lincoln and neighboring communities recover from an early snowstorm that cut power to nearly one million Nebraskans as a part of Operation Bush Hog.

Lineage
 Constituted as the 155th Fighter Group (Air Defense) and allotted to the Air National Guard
 Extended federal recognition and activated on 1 June 1960
 Redesignated 155th Tactical Reconnaissance Group on 1 May 1964
 Redesignated 155th Reconnaissance Group on 16 March 1992
 Redesignated 155th Air Refueling Group on 1 January 1994
 Redesignated 155th Air Refueling Wing on 1 October 1995

Assignments
 Nebraska Air National Guard, 1 June 1960 – Present
 Gained by: Air Defense Command
 Gained by: Tactical Air Command, 1 May 1964
 Gained by: Air Combat Command, 1 June 1992
 Gained by: Air Mobility Command, 1 January 1994 – Present

Components
 173d Fighter Interceptor (later Tactical Reconnaissance, Reconnaissance, Air Refueling) Squadron, 1 June 1960 – Present
155th Security Forces Squadron
other units

Stations
 Lincoln AFB (later Air National Guard Base), 1 June 1960 – Present

Aircraft
 F-86L Sabre Interceptor, 1960-1964
 RF-84F Thunderstreak, 1964-1972
 RF-4C Phantom II, 1972-1993
 KC-135R Stratotanker, 1993–Present

References

Notes

Bibliography

 155th Air Refueling Wing@globalsecurity.org
 History of the Nebraska Air National Guard

External links
155th Air Refueling Wing – Nebraska Air National Guard

Wings of the United States Air National Guard
Military units and formations in Nebraska
0155